The Embassy of the United States of America, Singapore is the diplomatic mission of the United States to Singapore. It is one of the largest American embassies in the Asia-Pacific region and the focal point for events relating to the United States held in Singapore.

It also provides assistance to American citizens and residents who live in Singapore and issues long term visas to Singapore nationals or other foreign nationals in Singapore who needs a visa to visit the United States.

The office of the United States Ambassador to Singapore is currently held by Jonathan E. Kaplan, appointed with effect from 6 December 2021.

Location
The embassy is located at Tanglin Road. The closest Mass Rapid Transit (MRT) station is Napier.

History

Early years
The first US diplomatic mission in Singapore was established in 1833 with the assignment of Joseph Balestier as consul. Although Singapore was an important free trade port, there was some question over whether Americans were legally allowed to conduct business there by the British, and so he was officially assigned to "Rhio (Riau, then a part of the Dutch East Indies) and such other places as are nearer thereto than to the Residence of any other Consul or Vice Consul of the United States" while residing in Singapore and mostly conducting business related to the territory. It was only in 1836 that an official consulate was established in Singapore with Balestier as consul. The post was promoted to a consulate-general in 1893.

20th century
The mission acquired the Spring Grove house in 1930 to house diplomats and opened a United States Information Service library on 26 Raffles Place in 1950 that the embassy claims "was so popular that bus services to downtown Singapore had to be extended through the evenings".

A new consulate building, the first to be built instead of acquired for this purpose, was opened on 30 Hill Road in 1961. Although the United States first proposed that the post be raised to embassy status in late 1965, the Singaporean government took a while to warm up to the idea as it gradually shifted to improve relations with the US while maintaining a non-aligned stance overall, and the promotion was finally agreed to and executed in April 1966.

Current location
During the 1990s, it was decided that the embassy was to be moved to a new site at the Tanglin district for improved security and capacity measures, with several embassy properties being sold in 1989 to fund the nearly US$100 million cost of the new compound. In 1994, ground was broken and the construction of the new complex officially began. Designed by The Stubbins Associates, it was completed in 1997 after around two years.

Role in Singapore–United States relations
Although Singapore and the United States have generally good relations, the embassy has been reprimanded at times by the Singapore government over allegations of interference in Singapore's internal politics.

Hendrickson affair

E. Mason "Hank" Hendrickson was serving as the First Secretary of the United States Embassy in Singapore when he was expelled by the Singaporean government in May 1988.

Prior to his expulsion, he arranged for local politicians Francis Seow and Patrick Seong to travel to Washington, D.C. to meet with American officials at Hendrickson's arrangement. After their return, Singapore detained them under the Internal Security Act (ISA). Based on Seow and Seong's statements while in custody, the Singaporean government alleged that Hendrickson attempted to interfere in Singapore's internal affairs by cultivating opposition figures for the upcoming 1988 Singaporean general election. First Deputy Prime Minister Goh Chok Tong stated that Hendrickson's alleged conspiracy had intentions on bringing down the current Singaporean government.

In the aftermath of Hendrickson's expulsion, the U.S. State Department praised his performance in Singapore and denied any impropriety in his actions. The State Department also retaliated by expelling Robert Chua from Washington D.C., a Singaporean diplomat equal in rank to Mason. The State Department's refusal to reprimand Hendrickson, along with their expulsion of the Singaporean diplomat, sparked a protest in Singapore by the National Trades Union Congress (NTUC); they drove buses around the embassy, held a rally attended by thousands of workers, and issued a statement deriding the U.S. as being "sneaky, arrogant, and untrustworthy".

Virtual seminar
In May 2021, a minor event occurred after the embassy held a virtual seminar with an LGBT group about the economic benefits of inclusion worldwide, with Singaporean authorities stating that it amounted to U.S. interference in the national debate over the government's LGBT policies. It also declared that such domestic social and political matters are "choices for only Singaporeans to debate and decide." Embassy representatives refuted those allegations.

See also
 United States Ambassador to Singapore
 Singapore–United States relations
 Embassy of Singapore in Washington, D.C.

Notes

References

Further reading

External links

Official website – U.S. Embassy Singapore

Singapore
United States
Singapore–United States relations